Geraldin Rojas (born 6 July 1981) is a contemporary Argentine tango dancer, also known as Geraldin Rojas de Paludi.

She started her career in 1988. She performed tango in the films Assassination Tango, The Man Who Captured Eichmann, and Je ne suis pas là pour être aimé. At age 16 she ran away from home to be a tango dancer. She dances with her husband Ezequiel Paludi. They have performed in Forever tango.

She has danced in tango festivals worldwide.

Notes and references

External links
www.tangomatter.com

1981 births
Living people
Tango dancers